Langskavlen Glacier is a short, steep glacier flowing from the north side of Skavlhø Mountain in the Payer Mountains of Queen Maud Land, Antarctica. It was mapped by Norwegian cartographers from surveys and air photos by the Sixth Norwegian Antarctic Expedition (1956–60) and named Langskavlen (the long snowdrift).

See also
 List of glaciers in the Antarctic
 Glaciology

References

 

Glaciers of Queen Maud Land
Princess Astrid Coast